Lorita is a genus of moths belonging to the subfamily Tortricinae of the family Tortricidae.

Species
Lorita baccharivora Pogue, 1988
Lorita insulicola Razowski & Becker, 2007
Lorita lepidulana (Forbes, 1931)
Lorita scarificata (Meyrick, 1917)

See also
List of Tortricidae genera

References

 , 1939, Bull. S. Calif. Acad. Sci. 38: p.100
 ,2005 World Catalogue of Insects, 6
 , 2011: Diagnoses and remarks on genera of Tortricidae, 2: Cochylini (Lepidoptera: Tortricidae). Shilap Revista de Lepidopterologia 39 (156): 397-414.

External links
tortricidae.com

Cochylini
Tortricidae genera